Kendrick Lamar is an American rapper and songwriter. After releasing several mixtapes and his debut studio album Section.80 (2011), he gained mainstream recognition following the release of his second studio album Good Kid, M.A.A.D City (2012). The album earned Lamar seven nominations at the 56th Annual Grammy Awards, including Album of the Year, Best New Artist and Best Rap Album. He then won his first two Grammy Awards for Best Rap Song and Best Rap Performance for his single "I". His third studio album To Pimp a Butterfly (2015) helped him receive the most Grammy nominations by a rapper in one night, with eleven. He won five of those awards at the 58th ceremony, including Best Rap Album, Best Rap Song and Best Rap Performance for "Alright", and Best Rap/Sung Collaboration for "These Walls" with Bilal, Anna Wise and Thundercat.

In 2015, Lamar received the California State Senate's Generational Icon Award from State Senator Isadore Hall III. He released his fourth studio album Damn in 2017, which went on to win five awards at the 60th Annual Grammy Awards, including Best Rap Album, and become the first non-classical or jazz work to win the Pulitzer Prize for Music. His curated soundtrack for the superhero film Black Panther (2018) won the Grammy Award for Best Rap Performance for the single "King's Dead" with Jay Rock, Future and James Blake, and receive an Academy Award nomination for the single "All the Stars" with SZA. Awarded 2 iHeartRadio Music Awards along with the accomplishment of reaching 1 Billion Total Audience Spins for “Love f/Zacari”.  In 2022, Lamar won the Grammy Award for Best Rap Performance for the single "Family Ties" with Baby Keem, and the Primetime Emmy Award for Outstanding Variety Special (Live) for co-headlining the Pepsi Super Bowl LVI Halftime Show. He was also nominated for eight Grammy Awards at the 65th ceremony following the release of his fifth studio album Mr. Morale & the Big Steppers. in 2022, Lamar got nominated in South African Hip Hop Awards for Best International Act and he won.

Awards and nominations

Other accolades

Listicles

State and cultural honors

Notes

References

Lamar, Kendrick
awards